The discography of Motohiro Hata, a Japanese singer-songwriter, consists of four studio albums, four extended plays, two live albums, two compilation albums, seven Video albums, and 23 singles.

Albums

Studio albums

Compilation albums

Live albums

EPs

Singles

As lead artist

As featured artist

Promotional singles

Other charted songs

Other appearances

Videography

Video albums

Notes

References

External links
Official website (Office Augusta)

Pop music discographies
Discographies of Japanese artists